Dragan "Guzo" Vujović (born 19 August 1953) is a former Yugoslav and Montenegrin professional footballer who played as a forward.

Born in Cetinje, Vujović spent the majority of his playing career at Budućnost Titograd, making nearly 200 appearances in the Yugoslav First League. He also played overseas for the Montreal Manic and the New York Cosmos in the North American Soccer League and the Major Indoor Soccer League.

From August to September 2004, Vujović served as caretaker manager of the Serbia and Montenegro U21s together with Tomislav Sivić.

References

External links
 

1953 births
Living people
Sportspeople from Cetinje
Yugoslav footballers
Montenegrin footballers
Association football forwards
FK Budućnost Podgorica players
Montreal Manic players
New York Cosmos players
New York Cosmos (MISL) players
Yugoslav First League players
North American Soccer League (1968–1984) players
North American Soccer League (1968–1984) indoor players
Major Indoor Soccer League (1978–1992) players
Yugoslav expatriate footballers
Expatriate soccer players in Canada
Expatriate soccer players in the United States
Yugoslav expatriate sportspeople in Canada
Yugoslav expatriate sportspeople in the United States
Serbia and Montenegro football managers
Montenegrin football managers